Vaughan Somers (born 27 May 1951) is an Australian professional golfer.

Somers was born in Queensland, Australia.

Somers had modest success as a professional golfer, winning the 1975 North Coast Open and the 1985 Ford Dealers South Australian Open. He also had some other top three finishes including runner-up in both the 1983 KLM Dutch Open and the 1986 Victorian Open, and third place in the 1987 Australian Masters.

Somers played in multiple Open Championships, making the cut four times with his best finish a tie for 21st place in the 1986 Open Championship.

Somers is now a father to two sons and has worked as the General Manager of the Melbourne Golf Academy (MGA), located on the Melbourne Sandbelt.

Professional wins (5)

PGA Tour of Australasia wins (4)

PGA Tour of Australasia playoff record (0–2)

Other wins (1)
1975 South Australian PGA Championship

Results in major championships

Note: Somers only played in The Open Championship.

CUT = Missed the cut (3rd round cut in 1982 Open Championship)
"T" = Tied

Team appearances
Hennessy Cognac Cup (representing the Rest of the World): 1982

References

External links

Australian male golfers
PGA Tour of Australasia golfers
European Tour golfers
People from Queensland
1951 births
Living people